Tina Gifty Naa Ayele Mensah (born 23 January 1964) is a Ghanaian politician and the member of parliament for Weija-Gbawe constituency. She is a member of the New Patriotic Party and was appointed into office as deputy Health Minister by Nana Addo on 15 March 2017.

Early life and education
Mensah was born on 23 January 1964 in Jamestown, British Accra of the Greater Accra Region. She had her secondary education at Accra Girls School. She holds a bachelor's degree in Public Administration and Masters in international relations and Diplomacy from the Ghana Institute of Management and Public Administration.

Politics 
Mensah secured 34,216 votes out of the 59,926 valid votes cast in the 2016 parliamentary elections. Obuobia Darko-Opoku and Jessica Adwoa Mannuel were the contesting candidates.

She contested the 2020 Ghanaian general election as the parliamentary candidate for the New Patriotic Party, and won.

Career 
She was the managing director of Gemens Company LTD. in Mamprobi, Accra.

Awards
On 4 August 2017, she was awarded by the Ghana-Nigeria Youth Organization for outstanding leadership. In 2017 she was adjudged best Deputy Minister by FAKS Investigative Services.

Personal life
Tina is married with three children. She identifies as a Christian.

References

Living people
1964 births
Women members of the Parliament of Ghana
Ghanaian MPs 2017–2021
New Patriotic Party politicians
Ghana Institute of Management and Public Administration alumni
People from Greater Accra Region
Ghanaian MPs 2021–2025
Accra Girls Senior High School alumni
21st-century Ghanaian women politicians